Eling and Bury Marshes is a  biological Site of Special Scientific Interest between Totton and Southampton in Hampshire. It is part of Solent and Southampton Water Ramsar site and  Special Protection Area, and of Solent Maritime Special Area of Conservation.

This site is composed of two dissimilar saltmarshes which are separated by intertidal mudflats. Eling Great Marsh is grazed and has a close sward, while Bury Marsh is ungrazed and has a more diverse flora. The site is part of Southampton Water, a tidal estuary which is nationally important for its populations of waders.

References

 
Sites of Special Scientific Interest in Hampshire